Delcourt is a French publishing house that specializes in comics and manga.

It was founded in 1986 through the fusion of the magazines Charlie Mensuel and Pilote. Guy Delcourt, chief editor of the latter, named the new publishing house Guy Delcourt Productions.

Delcourt is the third largest publisher of Franco-Belgian comics, behind Média-Participations and Glénat, and produces some 480 comics a year.

Publications

Bandes Déssinées (Franco-Belgian comics)

Delcourt

 A l'Ombre de l'Echafaud (since 2001)
 Aquablue (since 1988)
 Amenophis IV (since 2000)
 Asphodèle
 Angela
 Après la Nuit (since 2008)
 Baker Street
 Beowulf
 Bienvenue chez les Ch'tis
 Bienvenue en Chine
 C.O.P.S.
 Ceux qui rampent
 Chasseurs de Dragons
 Chronicles of The Dragon Knights
 CryoZone (from 1996 to 2005)
 De Cape et de Crocs (since 1995)
 Desk
 Donjon (since 1998)
 Dwarves
 Elves
 Felicidad
 Gibier de Potence (since 2001)
 Histoires de Mecs et de Nanas (since 2009)
 Le Dieu Singe
 Les Legendaires (since 2004)
 Les lumières de l'Amalou (from 1990 to 1997)
 Okko (since 2005)
 Sillage (Original version, 1998 – present) with Nävis and Les chroniques de Sillage
 The Chronicles Of Legion
 The Snake and The Spear

Series B

 Arcanes (since 1998)
 Arcane Majeure (since 2003)
 Carmen McCallum with Code McCallum (since 1995)
 Carmen+Travis (crossover - from 2003 to 2005)
 Golden City with Golden Cup
 Le Grand Jeu
 L'Histoire Secrète
 Météors
 Nash (since  1997)
 Showergate (since  2007)
 Tao Bang (since 1999)
 Travis with Travis Karmatronics (since 1997)
 Zentak (from 1997 to 1999)

Comics (American-British comics)

 30 Jours de Nuit
 Black Hole (French edition, 2007)
 Au Coeur de la Tempête (1991 - French ed 2009)
 Mon Dernier Jour au Vietnam (2000 - French ed 2001)
 Down (2007)
 Echo
 Elektra (formerly - now published by Panini)
 Les enquêtes de Sam & Twitch
 Fagin le Juif (2003)
 Fathom with Fathom Origins
 Freshmen (2007)
 From Hell (2000)
 Girls (2006–present)
 The Goon (since 1999 - French ed since 2005)
 Hard Boiled
 HellBoy with B.P.R.D
 Hunter Killer (2005 - French ed since 2006)
 Indiana Jones
 Invincible (French edition, 2005 – present)
 I Never Liked You Je ne t'ai jamais aimé (French edition since 2010)
 Jinx (2006)
 Love & Rockets
 The Little Man Le petit homme (French edition, 2009)
 Madame Mirage (French edition, since 2009)
 Les Maîtres de l'Évasion Martha Washington (formerly)
 Necromancer (2006)
 Sandman (formerly - now published by Panini)
 ShockRockets (formerly)
 Soulfire (since 2007)
 Spawn with Les Chroniques de Spawn Star Wars (since 1999)
 Savage Dragon (since 2010)
 Supreme (since 2003)
 Swamp Thing (formerly)
 Tomb Raider (1999-2005 - French ed 2009)
 V pour Vendetta (1990 - Formerly)
 Walking Dead (since 2007)
 Wanted (2008)
 WitchBlade since #70 (French edition, 2008 – present)

Manga (Delcourt/Akata)
 Accords parfaits Amours Félines Après l'Amour Au bord de l'eau Ayako Baki Barbara Beck Berry Dynamite BX Ceux qui ont des ailes Charisma Comme Elles Suppli (Complément affectif) Coq de Combat Déclic Amoureux Demain les oiseaux Démons et chimères Dernier Soupir Dead Tube Freak Island Dororo Dreamin' Sun Effleurer le Ciel L'Empreinte du mal Enfant Soldat L'Etrange petite Tatari La Femme défigurée Les Fils de la Terre Flic à Tokyo La Force des Humbles Fragment Fruits Basket Girlfriend Global Garden Gogo Monster Gokinjo Heads Histoires d'Asie et d'Ailleurs Histoires pour tous Imbéciles heureux ! L'Incident de Sakai et Autres Récits Guerriers Initiation Intrigues au Pays du Matin Calme Inugami Je ne suis pas mort Je ne suis pas un ange Jornada Journaliste Kajô Karakuri Circus Ki-itchi !! Kiômaru Kirihito Kurozakuro Les Lamentations de l'Agneau Larme Ultime Last Quarter Le Cocon La Légende de Songoku Liselotte et la forêt des sorcières Lollipop Love Tic Lovely Complex Magic Magie intérieure ! Maka-Maka Le Manoir de l'Horreur Mes voisins les Yamada Mirai no Utena Le Monde de Misaki Les Mystères de Taishô Nana Nés pour cogner Nico Says Niraikanai Onmyôji Otomen Le Pacte des Yôkai Pékin, années folles Persona Ping pong Princess Jellyfish Réincarnation Rivage Romance d'outre-tombe Sans Compromis Satsuma Sayûkiden Shibuya Love Hotel Sing "Yesterday" for Me Sous la bannière de la liberté Subaru Sweet Relax Switch Girl!! Tajikarao Tengu Tennen Togari Tsuru Tueur ! Twinkle stars 星は歌う Un Destin Clément Un drôle de père Une sacrée mamie Vague à L'âme Les Vents de la Colère La Voix des fleurs Yakitate!! Japan Zatoïchi''

References

External links 

  
  SérieB Homepage
  Akata (Manga Label)

 
Book publishing companies of France
French companies established in 1986
Publishing companies established in 1986
Companies based in Paris
Comic book publishing companies of France
French brands